Carlos Alberto Silva Loaiza commonly known as Chale Silva (10 July 1919 – 23 July 2009) was a professional footballer who played in the Colombian Professional Football League and Mexican Primera División.

Club career
Born in San José to Lizandro Silva LeRois and Zeneida Loaiza Infante, Silva played as a defender. He began his career with Segunda Division side Orión F.C., helping the club win promotion to the Costa Rican Primera División. He made his Primera debut with Orión on 7 August 1936, and captained the club to a title-winning, undefeated season in 1943. He joined rivals C.S. La Libertad the following season.

Silva began playing professional football with Mexican Primera División side Moctezuma de Orizaba in 1944. After three seasons in Mexico, he played professionally in Colombia where he signed with Universidad de Bogotá in 1948. He also played for Colombian sides Once Deportivo and Deportivo Manizales.

He finished his 27-year playing career with Deportivo Sula in Honduras and C.S. Uruguay de Coronado in his home country.

International career
Silva made several appearances for the Costa Rica national football team, helping the side win the 1941 CCCF Championship unbeaten in six matches.

Personal
Silva was married to Aracely Arguedas and had 4 children. He died aged 90 in July 2009.

References

1919 births
2009 deaths
Footballers from San José, Costa Rica
Association football defenders
Costa Rican footballers
Costa Rica international footballers
Once Caldas footballers
Categoría Primera A players
Liga MX players
Costa Rican expatriate footballers
Expatriate footballers in Mexico
Expatriate footballers in Colombia
Expatriate footballers in Honduras
Costa Rican expatriate sportspeople in Mexico
Costa Rican expatriate sportspeople in Colombia
Costa Rican expatriate sportspeople in Honduras